Nodaway Township is a township in Page County, Iowa. Clarinda, the seat of Page County, is located in Nodaway Township.

History
Nodaway Township was established in 1858.

References

Townships in Page County, Iowa
Townships in Iowa